The Daily Ekdin ( Ekdin, meaning "One Day") is a  Bengali daily newspaper in West Bengal, India published from Kolkata, Durgapur and Siliguri. Arjun Singh is the editor of the newspaper.

References

Bengali-language newspapers published in India
Newspapers published in Kolkata
2006 establishments in West Bengal
Publications established in 2006